Saint Vivian may refer to:

 Saint Vimin (died 579), Scottish abbot and bishop
 Saint Bibiana (died c. 360),  Roman virgin and martyr

See also
 Saint Vivianus
 Saint-Vivien (disambiguation)